The Jaipur Column is a monumental column in the middle of the courtyard in front of Rashtrapati Bhavan, the presidential residence in New Delhi, Delhi, India. In 1912 Madho Singh II, the Maharaja of Jaipur, offered to sponsor its construction to commemorate the 1911 Delhi Durbar and the transfer of the capital of India from Kolkata to New Delhi.

The column was designed by the architect Sir Edwin Lutyens. In 1920, Lutyens submitted his design for the column to the Royal Academy of Arts in London, as his diploma work for his election as a fellow of the academy. The structure was completed in 1930.

The column is predominantly made of cream sandstone, with red sandstone used for the base. At the top there is an egg surmounted by a bronze lotus flower and a six-pointed glass star. These are supported by a steel shaft running through the column's entire length.

There are bas-reliefs around the base, designed by the British sculptor Charles Sargeant Jagger. Jagger also designed the elephants carved into the walls around the courtyard, as well as the statue of George V, Emperor of India which formerly stood under the canopy next to India Gate.

On the base there is an inscription, with wording supplied by Lord Irwin, the Viceroy of India:

 In thought faith
 In word wisdom
 In deed courage
 In life service
 So may India be great

This was a modification of the wording originally proposed by Lutyens:

 Endow your thought with faith
 Your deed with courage
 Your life with sacrifice
 So all men may know
 The greatness of India

Notes

References

External links
Lutyens Trust images

New Delhi
Monumental columns in India
Works of Edwin Lutyens in India
Sculptures by Charles Sargeant Jagger
Buildings and structures completed in 1930
Rashtrapati Bhavan